Montage is the second compilation album by saxophonist Kenny G, released by BMG in 1990.

Track listing
"Songbird" – 5:03
"Tradewinds" – 4:09
"Tribeca" – 4:38
"Virgin Island" – 3:14
"I've Been Missin' You" – 4:15
"Uncle Al" – 4:32
"What Does It Take (To Win Your Love)" – 4:06
"Silhouette" – 4:26
"Midnight Motion" – 4:08
"Against Doctor's Orders" – 4:06
"Hi, How Ya Doin'?" – 5:37
"Sade" – 4:20
"Going Home" – 4:12
"We've Saved the Best for Last" – 4:19

Certifications

References

Kenny G compilation albums
1990 compilation albums